Linaria triphylla is a species of plants in the family Plantaginaceae.

Sources

References 

triphylla
Flora of Malta